Let the Music Play: Supreme Rarities 1960-1969 (Motown Lost & Found) is a 2-CD set of The Supremes music released by Hip-O Records on March 25, 2008.

Overview
This is a notable release as it includes many of the unreleased songs Diana Ross, Mary Wilson, Florence Ballard, Barbara Martin, and Cindy Birdsong recorded. This limited-edition collection contains 48 tracks, including "I Saw Him Standing There" (with Ballard on lead), "It's Not Unusual", and "MacArthur Park". Also included are rare, alternate versions of previously released singles, including "Someday We'll Be Together", "You Can't Hurry Love", and "Back in My Arms Again".

Track listings

Disc one
"(You Can) Depend On Me"
"Tears of Sorrow" (version 2)
"Because I Love Him"
"Hey Baby" (version 1)
"Too Hot"
"You're Gonna Come to Me" (version 1)
"You're Gonna Come to Me" (version 2)
"It Makes No Difference Now" (alternate version)
"Come on Boy" (alternate version)
"Just Call Me" (stereo mix)
"I Saw Him Standing There"
"Not Fade Away"
"Ooowee Baby" (alternate mix)
"It's All Your Fault" (version 1)
"Hits Medley: Come See About Me/Baby Love/Stop! In the Name of Love"
"Cupid (alternate extended mix)"
"Take Me Where You Go" (version 3)
"Back in My Arms Again" (alternate vocal)
"You Can't Hurry Love" (alternate vocal)
"Mickey's Monkey"
"Uptight (Everything's Alright)" (alternate vocal)
"It's Not Unusual"
"(I Can't Get No) Satisfaction"
"Come and Get These Memories" (alternate mix)
"I Can't Help Myself" (alternate mix)
"Let the Music Play" (alternate vocal)

Disc two
"Don't Let True Love Die" (extended version)
"What a Friend We Have in Jesus"
"Every Time I Feel the Spirit"
"Believe in Me"
"The Beginning of The End of Love" (stereo mix)
"People" (unedited version)
"Over the Rainbow"
"Wish I Knew"
"I Can't Give Back the Love I Feel for You"
"I'll Set You Free" (alternate vocal)
"Ain't No Sun Since You've Been Gone"
"In the Evening of Our Love"
"Love Child" (alternate version)
"Those Precious Memories"
"I'm Livin' in Shame" (version 1)
"MacArthur Park"
"You're Gonna Hear from Me"
"Canadian Sunset"
"Autumn Leaves"
"The Look of Love"
"Someday We'll Be Together" (alternate vocal)
BONUS: Scott Regan Promos

Personnel

Performers
Diana Ross: lead vocals, background vocals
Mary Wilson: lead vocals, background vocals
Florence Ballard: lead vocals, background vocals
Barbara Martin: background vocals
Cindy Birdsong: background vocals
The Andantes: background vocals

Product details
Number of Discs: 2
Label: Hip-O Select
ASIN: B0016CP1CI

References

2008 compilation albums
The Supremes compilation albums
Motown compilation albums